Year 1019 (MXIX) was a common year starting on Thursday (link will display the full calendar) of the Julian calendar.

Events 
 By place 

 Europe 
 Sviatopolk I dies, and is succeeded by his brother Yaroslav I (the Wise). He becomes the Grand Prince of Kiev with the support of the Novgorodians and the help of Varangian (Viking) mercenaries. Yaroslav consolidates the Kievan state, through both cultural and administrative improvements, and military campaigns.

 Africa 
 The Azdâji conquest puts an end to the Kingdom of Nekor, in Morocco.

 Asia 
 March 10 – Battle of Gwiju: Korean forces, led by General Gang Gam-chan, gain a decisive victory over the Khitan Liao Dynasty at modern-day Kusong, ending the Third Goryeo-Khitan War.
 Toi invasion: Jurchen pirates, from the Khitan Liao Dynasty in modern-day Manchuria, sail with about 50 ships to invade Kyūshū in Japan. They assault the islands Tsushima and Iki. In April the pirates raid Matsuura but are defeated by the Japanese army.
 Japanese statesman and regent Fujiwara no Michinaga retires from public life, installing his son Yorimichi as regent. Michinaga, however, continues to direct affairs of state from his retirement, and remains the de facto ruler of Japan, until his death in 1028.

Births 
 November 17 – Sima Guang, Chinese politician and writer (d. 1086)
 December 29 – Munjong, ruler of Goryeo (Korea) (d. 1083)
 Abe no Sadato, Japanese nobleman and samurai (d. 1062)
 Dominic de la Calzada, Spanish priest and saint (d. 1109)
 Gundekar II (or Gunzo), bishop of Eichstätt (d. 1075)
 Mauger (or Malger), archbishop of Rouen (d. 1055)
 Śrīpati, Indian astronomer and mathematician (d. 1066)
 Sweyn II (Estridsson), king of Denmark (approximate date)
 Wang Gui, Chinese official and chancellor (d. 1085)
 Wen Tong, Chinese painter and calligrapher (d. 1079)
 Yūsuf Balasaguni, Karakhanid statesman (d. 1085)
 Zeng Gong, Chinese scholar and historian (d. 1083)

Deaths 
 June 28 – Heimerad (or Heimo), German priest and saint
 October 6 – Frederick of Luxembourg, count of Moselgau (b. 965)
 Aldhun (or Ealdhun), bishop of Lindisfarne (or 1018)
 Sergius II (the Studite), patriarch of Constantinople
 Sviatopolk I, Grand Prince of Kiev (b. 980)

References